The Eisner Award for Best Single Issue/One-Shot is an award for "creative achievement" in American comic books.

Name Changes

The award was launched as "Best Single Issue" in 1988. In 1991 it was changed to "Best Story or Single Issue." In 1992 it was changed to "Best Single Issue or Story" and multi-issue stories were eligible. In 1993 it was changed to "Best Single Issue (Self-Contained Story)." In 2002 it was changed to "Best Single Issue." In 2003 it was changed to "Best Single Issue or One-Shot." In 2022 it was changed to "Best Single Issue/One-Shot (must be able to stand alone)."

Winners and nominees

Notes

References

Category
1988 establishments in the United States
Annual events in the United States
Awards established in 1988
Single Issue/One-Shot